Kelsey Mitchell (born November 12, 1995) is an American professional basketball player for the Indiana Fever of the Women's National Basketball Association (WNBA). Mitchell was the second overall pick in the 2018 WNBA draft. She completed her college career with the Ohio State Buckeyes in 2018. In February 2018, she was named the Big Ten women's basketball player of the year by the conference's coaches. She was a second team All-American in 2015, 2017, and 2018, while notching first team All-American in 2016.

During her senior college season, Mitchell averaged 24.4 points per game on 46.1 percent shooting and 40.3 percent shooting from three. She also managed 4.1 assists per game and 3.2 rebounds per game. She finished the regular season of her final season with the third-most points in NCAA Division I history, and ultimately finished her career with 3,402 points, trailing only Kelsey Plum of Washington.

In 2019, Mitchell played for Egyptian club Al Ahly in the 2019 FIBA Africa Women's Clubs Champions Cup.

Personal
Mitchell is from Cincinnati, Ohio, and graduated from Princeton High School in Sharonville, Ohio.

WNBA career statistics

Regular season

|-
| style='text-align:left;'|2018
| style='text-align:left;'|Indiana
| 34 || 17 || 24.4 || .346 || .335 || .804 || 1.8 || 2.7 || 0.7 || 0.1 || 1.9 || 12.7
|-
| style='text-align:left;'|2019
| style='text-align:left;'|Indiana
| 34 || 20 || 25.1 || .387 || .374 || .836 || 1.6 || 2.6 || 0.4 || 0.1 || 1.7 || 13.6
|-
| style='text-align:left;'|2020
| style='text-align:left;'|Indiana
| 22 || 22 || 32.1 || .448 || .389 || .849 || 2.2 || 2.8 || 0.6 || 0.1 || 2.5 || 17.9
|-
| style='text-align:left;'|2021
| style='text-align:left;'|Indiana
| 32 || 32 || 33.1 || .431 || .335 || .882 || 2.6 || 2.5 || 1.1 || 0.2 || 2.0 || 17.8
|-
| style='text-align:left;'|2022
| style='text-align:left;'|Indiana
| 31 || 31 || 32.6 || .438 || .409 || .861 || 1.9 || 4.2 || 0.9 || 0.2 || 2.4 || 18.4
|-
| style='text-align:left;'| Career
| style='text-align:left;'| 5 years, 1 team
| 153 || 122 || 29.1 || .409 || .366 || .847 || 2.0 || 3.0 || 0.8 || 0.2 || 2.1 || 15.9

Ohio State statistics
Statistics courtesy NCAA Statistics

See also
 List of NCAA Division I women's basketball career scoring leaders
 List of NCAA Division I women's basketball career 3-point scoring leaders

References

External links
Ohio State Buckeyes profile
USA Basketball profile

1997 births
Living people
All-American college women's basketball players
American women's basketball players
Basketball players from Cincinnati
Indiana Fever draft picks
Indiana Fever players
McDonald's High School All-Americans
Ohio State Buckeyes women's basketball players
Parade High School All-Americans (girls' basketball)
Point guards